Lebyazhy (masculine), Lebyazhaya (feminine), or Lebyazhye (neuter) is the name of several inhabited localities in Russia.

Altai Krai
As of 2010, five rural localities in Altai Krai bear this name:
Lebyazhye, Barnaul, Altai Krai, a selo in Lebyazhinskaya Settlement Administration of the city of krai significance of Barnaul
Lebyazhye, Krasnogorsky District, Altai Krai, a selo in Souskanikhinsky Selsoviet of Krasnogorsky District
Lebyazhye, Pavlovsky District, Altai Krai, a selo in Lebyazhinsky Selsoviet of Pavlovsky District
Lebyazhye, Pervomaysky District, Altai Krai, a selo in Severny Selsoviet of Pervomaysky District
Lebyazhye, Yegoryevsky District, Altai Krai, a selo in Lebyazhinsky Selsoviet of Yegoryevsky District

Amur Oblast
As of 2010, one rural locality in Amur Oblast bears this name:
Lebyazhye, Amur Oblast, a selo in Lebyazhyevsky Rural Settlement of Seryshevsky District

Astrakhan Oblast
As of 2010, two rural localities in Astrakhan Oblast bear this name:
Lebyazhye, Kamyzyaksky District, Astrakhan Oblast, a selo in Lebyazhinsky Selsoviet of Kamyzyaksky District
Lebyazhye, Volodarsky District, Astrakhan Oblast, a selo in Kalininsky Selsoviet of Volodarsky District

Republic of Bashkortostan
As of 2010, one rural locality in the Republic of Bashkortostan bears this name:
Lebyazhy, Republic of Bashkortostan, a selo in Zubovsky Selsoviet of Ufimsky District

Chelyabinsk Oblast
As of 2010, one rural locality in Chelyabinsk Oblast bears this name:
Lebyazhy, Chelyabinsk Oblast, a settlement in Knyazhensky Selsoviet of Bredinsky District

Kemerovo Oblast
As of 2010, one rural locality in Kemerovo Oblast bears this name:
Lebyazhy, Kemerovo Oblast, a settlement in Lebyazhya Rural Territory of Mariinsky District

Kirov Oblast
As of 2010, one urban locality in Kirov Oblast bears this name:
Lebyazhye, Kirov Oblast, an urban-type settlement in Lebyazhsky District

Krasnodar Krai
As of 2010, one rural locality in Krasnodar Krai bears this name:
Lebyazhy, Krasnodar Krai, a khutor under the administrative jurisdiction of  the town of Gulkevichi, Gulkevichsky District

Krasnoyarsk Krai
As of 2010, two rural localities in Krasnoyarsk Krai bear this name:
Lebyazhye, Krasnoturansky District, Krasnoyarsk Krai, a selo in Lebyazhensky Selsoviet of Krasnoturansky District
Lebyazhye, Nizhneingashsky District, Krasnoyarsk Krai, a settlement in Kanifolninsky Selsoviet of Nizhneingashsky District

Kurgan Oblast
As of 2010, six inhabited localities in Kurgan Oblast bear this name:

Urban localities
Lebyazhye, Lebyazhyevsky District, Kurgan Oblast, an urban-type settlement in Lebyazhyevsky District

Rural localities
Lebyazhye, Belozersky District, Kurgan Oblast, a village in Yagodninsky Selsoviet of Belozersky District
Lebyazhye, Chastoozersky District, Kurgan Oblast, a village in Sivkovsky Selsoviet of Chastoozersky District
Lebyazhye, Dalmatovsky District, Kurgan Oblast, a selo in Lebyazhsky Selsoviet of Dalmatovsky District
Lebyazhye, Kurtamyshsky District, Kurgan Oblast, a village in Pesyansky Selsoviet of Kurtamyshsky District
Lebyazhye, Mishkinsky District, Kurgan Oblast, a village in Krasnoznamensky Selsoviet of Mishkinsky District

Kursk Oblast
As of 2010, one rural locality in Kursk Oblast bears this name:
Lebyazhye, Kursk Oblast, a selo in Lebyazhensky Selsoviet of Kursky District

Leningrad Oblast
As of 2010, two inhabited localities in Leningrad Oblast bear this name:

Urban localities
Lebyazhye, Lomonosovsky District, Leningrad Oblast, an urban-type settlement under the administrative jurisdiction of Lebyazhenskoye Settlement Municipal Formation of Lomonosovsky District

Rural localities
Lebyazhye, Vyborgsky District, Leningrad Oblast, a logging depot settlement under the administrative jurisdiction of Roshchinskoye Settlement Municipal Formation of Vyborgsky District

Lipetsk Oblast
As of 2010, two rural localities in Lipetsk Oblast bear this name:
Lebyazhye, Dobrovsky District, Lipetsk Oblast, a selo in Bolshe-Khomutetsky Selsoviet of Dobrovsky District
Lebyazhye, Izmalkovsky District, Lipetsk Oblast, a selo in Lebyazhensky Selsoviet of Izmalkovsky District

Nizhny Novgorod Oblast
As of 2010, one rural locality in Nizhny Novgorod Oblast bears this name:
Lebyazhye, Nizhny Novgorod Oblast, a village in Kantaurovsky Selsoviet of the Bor City of Oblast Significance

Novosibirsk Oblast
As of 2010, two rural localities in Novosibirsk Oblast bear this name:
Lebyazhye, Bolotninsky District, Novosibirsk Oblast, a village in Bolotninsky District
Lebyazhye, Tatarsky District, Novosibirsk Oblast, a village in Tatarsky District

Omsk Oblast
As of 2010, one rural locality in Omsk Oblast bears this name:
Lebyazhye, Omsk Oblast, a village in Knyazevsky Rural Okrug of Nazyvayevsky District

Orenburg Oblast
As of 2010, one rural locality in Orenburg Oblast bears this name:
Lebyazhy, Orenburg Oblast, a settlement in Koltubansky Selsoviet of Buzuluksky District

Oryol Oblast
As of 2010, one rural locality in Oryol Oblast bears this name:
Lebyazhye, Oryol Oblast, a village in Kirovsky Selsoviet of Soskovsky District

Samara Oblast
As of 2010, one rural locality in Samara Oblast bears this name:
Lebyazhy, Samara Oblast, a settlement in Kinelsky District

Sverdlovsk Oblast
As of 2010, three rural localities in Sverdlovsk Oblast bear this name:
Lebyazhye, Kamensky District, Sverdlovsk Oblast, a settlement in Kamensky District
Lebyazhye, Krasnoufimsky District, Sverdlovsk Oblast, a village in Krasnoufimsky District
Lebyazhye, Tavdinsky District, Sverdlovsk Oblast, a settlement in Tavdinsky District

Tambov Oblast
As of 2010, one rural locality in Tambov Oblast bears this name:
Lebyazhye, Tambov Oblast, a selo in Nizhneshibryaysky Selsoviet of Uvarovsky District

Republic of Tatarstan
As of 2010, one rural locality in the Republic of Tatarstan bears this name:
Lebyazhye, Republic of Tatarstan, a selo in Alexeyevsky District

Tula Oblast
As of 2010, one rural locality in Tula Oblast bears this name:
Lebyazhye, Tula Oblast, a village in Panarinsky Rural Okrug of Volovsky District

Tyumen Oblast
As of 2010, one rural locality in Tyumen Oblast bears this name:
Lebyazhye, Tyumen Oblast, a village in Gotoputovsky Rural Okrug of Sorokinsky District

Ulyanovsk Oblast
As of 2010, one rural locality in Ulyanovsk Oblast bears this name:
Lebyazhye, Ulyanovsk Oblast, a selo in Lebyazhinsky Rural Okrug of Melekessky District

Volgograd Oblast
As of 2010, two rural localities in Volgograd Oblast bear this name:
Lebyazhy, Volgograd Oblast, a khutor in Kolovertinsky Selsoviet of Serafimovichsky District
Lebyazhye, Volgograd Oblast, a selo in Lebyazhensky Selsoviet of Kamyshinsky District

Voronezh Oblast
As of 2010, two rural localities in Voronezh Oblast bear this name:
Lebyazhye, Nizhnedevitsky District, Voronezh Oblast, a selo in Sinelipyagovskoye Rural Settlement of Nizhnedevitsky District
Lebyazhye, Ramonsky District, Voronezh Oblast, a selo in Pavlovskoye Rural Settlement of Ramonsky District